Geranium guamanense is a species of plant in the family Geraniaceae. It is endemic to Ecuador.  Its natural habitat is subtropical or tropical high-altitude grassland.

References

guamanense
Endemic flora of Ecuador
Vulnerable plants
Taxonomy articles created by Polbot
Plants described in 1996